A list of notable people from Shreveport, Louisiana, includes:

Actors, models, entertainers 

 K. D. Aubert, actress and former fashion model
 Pat Carroll (1927–2022), stage, film and television actress, voiced Disney's Ursula
Chi Chi DeVayne (1985–2020), drag queen and entertainer
Jared Leto, Oscar-winning actor
Joshua Logan (1908–1988), Broadway director of South Pacific and Mister Roberts; born in Texarkana, Texas, but raised in Shreveport.
Mary Miles Minter (1902–1984), silent film actress
Paul Mooney, comedian
Tricia O'Neil, actress
Kevin Rahm, actor
Brittney Rogers, Miss Louisiana USA 2003
Andy Sidaris (1931–2007), Hollywood film producer, director, actor, and screenwriter
Brenda Sykes, actress

Artists, designers 

 Ransom Ashley, photographer and actor
 Kevyn Aucoin, makeup artist and photographer
 Victor Joris, (1929–2013) fashion designer, attended C.E. Byrd High School.
 Edward F. Neild (1884–1955), architect who designed several prominent Shreveport homes, churches, and venues, as well as the Harry S. Truman Presidential Library and Museum in Independence, Missouri, having been selected for the task by U.S. President Harry Truman. His Son, Edward Jr. (1908–1958), was also an architect who designed the Hirsch Memorial Coliseum.
 Randy Thom, sound engineer and designer

Athletes 
Matt Alexander, Major League Baseball, pinch runner, Most career stolen bases and runs scored as a pinch runner.
Evelyn Ashford, winner of sprint gold medals at the 1984, 1988 and 1992 Olympics
Alan Autry, actor, football player and politician
Scott Baker, Major League Baseball pitcher
Arnaz Battle, Notre Dame and NFL player
Alana Beard, Duke Blue Devils and WNBA player, four-time All-Star.
Albert Belle, Major League Baseball outfielder, five-time All-Star
Brock Berlin, Evangel Academy, former football quarterback for the University of Florida Gators and University of Miami Hurricanes, professionally for the NFL’s Miami Dolphins, Dallas Cowboys, St. Louis Rams, and Detroit Lions
Henry Black, free safety for the Atlanta Falcons
Abram Booty, Evangel Academy, LSU Wide Receiver and Josh Booty's brother
John David Booty, Evangel Academy, USC and Houston Texans quarterback
Josh Booty, Evangel Academy, NFL quarterback and MLB third baseman
Terry Bradshaw, Hall of Fame quarterback (four-time Super Bowl winner for Pittsburgh Steelers) and TV commentator
Sam Burns, professional golfer
Kenny Davidson, American football player, DE, Huntington HS, LSU, NFL Steelers, Oilers, Bengals 1990–1996
Wendell Davis, American football player, WR Fairpark HS, LSU, 1st round pick Chicago Bears 1988–1995
Keyunta Dawson, Evangel Academy, New Orleans Saints football player
Joe Dumars (born 1963), basketball player
Joe Ferguson, football quarterback, Woodlawn High, Arkansas Razorbacks and NFL
Eddie Fisher (born 1936), baseball pitcher, 1959–1973
Charlie Hennigan, football player for Houston Oilers
Jacob Hester, Evangel Academy, San Diego Chargers football player
Tug Hulett, Evangel Academy, Major League Baseball second baseman
Stan Humphries, NFL quarterback for Washington Redskins (1988-1991) and San Diego Chargers (1992–1997)
Antawn Jamison, professional basketball player, 1998–2014
David Allen Lee, punter for Baltimore Colts, 1966–1978
Malik Newman (born 1997), basketball player in the Israeli Basketball Premier League
Bob Oliver, Major League Baseball player, 1965–1975
Robert Parish (born 1953), basketball Hall of Famer, Centenary College and NBA
Charles Henry Philyaw (born 1954), Texas Southern Tigers, former Oakland Raiders (defensive end) 1976-77 Super Bowl champion
Chase Pittman (born 1983), Evangel Academy, played college football at LSU and in the NFL for several years.
Michael Qualls (born 1994), basketball player for Hapoel Gilboa Galil of the Israeli Basketball Premier League
Jermauria Rasco, Evangel Academy, NFL linebacker for the Green Bay Packers, Tampa Bay Buccaneers, and Pittsburgh Steelers, played collegiately for the LSU Tigers
Freddie Spencer (born 1961), Grand Prix motorcycle champion, won 250cc and 500cc in 1985
Tommy Spinks (1948–2007), football wide receiver, Woodlawn High School, Louisiana Tech, and Minnesota Vikings
Hal Sutton, professional golfer, 1983 PGA Championship winner and 2004 Ryder Cup captain
Stromile Swift, NBA player, 2000–2009
Trent Taylor, Evangel Academy, NFL wide receiver for the Cincinnati Bengals and San Francisco 49ers
Eric Thomas, Evangel Academy, gridiron football player; current indoor football wide receiver and return specialist for the Iowa Barnstormers of the IFL, previously for the IFL's Cedar Rapids Titans, Nebraska Danger, and Green Bay Blizzard; played collegiately for the Troy Trojans; former Canadian football wide receiver in the CFL for the Saskatchewan Roughriders; and former American football wide receiver for the Indianapolis Colts and Buffalo Bills of the NFL
Jerry Tillery, Evangel Academy, NFL defensive end for the Los Angeles Chargers
David Toms, professional golfer, 2001 PGA Championship and 2018 U.S. Senior Open champions
Taijuan Walker, pitcher for New York Mets
Todd Walker, baseball player for seven MLB teams, lived in Bossier City
Ar'Darius Washington, Evangel Academy, NFL safety for the Baltimore Ravens, played collegiately for the TCU Horned Frogs
Vernon Wells, baseball player for three MLB teams
Sean West, Captain Shreve High School, Major League Baseball pitcher
Tre'Davious White, football cornerback for the Buffalo Bills
Monk Williams, football player 
Richard Williams, tennis coach and father and coach to Venus and Serena Williams

Wrongfully Convicted Individuals 

 Rodricus Crawford, exonerated in 2017 for murdering year-old son in Shreveport

Entrepreneurs 

 Betsy Vogel Boze, president and CEO, College of The Bahamas
 Randle T. Moore (1874–1957), banker, lumberman

Journalists 
 Henry L. Hooks (1921-2021), first African-American photojournalist to have photos of Americans of Color published in the San Bernardino Sun & Telegram
 Tim Brando (born 1956), radio and CBS and FOX Sports sportscaster
 John D. Ewing, publisher of Shreveport Times, radio station owner
 Jim Leslie (1937–1976), Shreveport journalist and public relations specialist, assassinated in Baton Rouge
 Jeffrey D. Sadow (born 1962), political scientist, columnist, professor at Louisiana State University in Shreveport

Musicians 

Jerry Beach (1941–2016), blues guitarist, Grammy nominee
Brady Blade, musician and entrepreneur
Brian Blade, Grammy winning musician, composer, session musician, and singer-songwriter.
Kix Brooks, country musician (Brooks & Dunn)
James Burton, guitarist
John Campbell, Blues guitarist
Van Cliburn (1934–2013), concert pianist
Kyle Craft, singer-songwriter and musician; former member of the indie rock band Gashcat
Jordan Davis, singer
David Egan (1954–2016), musician
D. J. Fontana (1931–2018), drummer
Hurricane Chris, rapper
Huddie William Ledbetter ('Leadbelly'), blues guitarist and singer
Jack Prince, singer, (1920-1994)
Claibe Richardson, guitarist and songwriter
Kenny Wayne Shepherd, blues guitarist
Hank Williams, Jr., country music singer
Jesse Winchester, (born 1944), musician, songwriter
Louise Yazbeck, (1910-1995), composer
Faron Young (1932–1996), country singer/songwriter; member of Country Music Hall of Fame

Musical groups 

Iwrestledabearonce, deathcore band based in Shreveport.
The Residents, avant-garde musical ensemble; lived in Shreveport until the middle 1960s, when they moved to San Mateo and later to San Francisco.

Politicians, civil servants 
John Boozman, U.S. Senator from Arkansas
Raleigh Brown, Texas House of Representatives and judge
Roy Brun, district judge and former Republican state legislator
Charles C. "Hondo" Campbell (1948–2016), 17th Commanding General, U.S. Army Forces Command; last surviving general who fought in Vietnam
Johnnie Cochran (1937–2005), criminal defense attorney for O. J. Simpson
George W. D'Artois (1925–1977), public safety commissioner
Jackson B. Davis (1918–2016), attorney and state senator (1956–1980)
Lloyd Hendrick (1908–1951), state senator for Caddo and DeSoto parishes, 1940–1948; Shreveport attorney
Mike Johnson (born 1972), U.S. Representative
J. Bennett Johnston Jr., U.S. senator for Louisiana
Russell B. Long, U.S. Senator for Louisiana
Jim McCrery, Congressman from Fourth District (R)
Danny Ray Mitchell, state representative
Cecil Morgan (1898–1999), state legislator, led impeachment of Huey Pierce Long, Jr., in 1929; later Standard Oil Company executive.
James George Palmer (1875–1952) Mayor of Shreveport, 1930–1932
Buddy Roemer (1943–2021), Governor of Louisiana
Phil Short (born 1947), state senator for St. Tammany Parish
Art Sour (1924–2000), state legislator and pioneer of Republican Party in Caddo Parish
Tom Stagg (1923–2015), U.S. District Court judge
Donald Ellsworth Walter, judge of the United States District Court for the Western District of Louisiana, U.S. attorney for the Western District, 1969–1977, based in Shreveport

Religious leaders 
Billy McCormack (1928–2012), Shreveport Baptist pastor and founding director of Christian Coalition of America

James Dobson founder of Focus on the Family.

Writers, authors 

H. Parrott Bacot, art historian
Jericho Brown, poet
Charlie Cook, author
Davidson Garrett, poet and actor
Bill Joyce, children's author
Judi Ann Mason, film and television writer
Mitchell Parish, lyricist
Jerry Pournelle, author

References

 
Shreveport
Shreveport, Louisiana